Turnu (Romanian for "the tower") may refer to several places in Romania:

Turnu Măgurele, a town in Teleorman County
Turnu, a village in Pecica town, Arad County
Turnu Roșu, a commune in Sibiu County
Turnu Ruieni, a commune in Caraș-Severin County
Drobeta-Turnu Severin, a city in Mehedinți County